The Second raid on Banu Thalabah took place in August, 627AD in 4th month of, 6AH of the Islamic calendar, under the leadership of Abu Ubaidah

The First Raid on Banu Thalabah was a failure, and many of Muhammad's companions were ambushed and killed. When Muhammad, learned of this incident, he immediately dispatched an army of 40 soldiers under the leadership of Abu Ubaidah bin al-Jarrah in retaliation for the killings of his companions. This army arrived there in Dhu al-Qassah just before dawn. Immediately upon their arrival, they raided the inhabitants by surprise, but they quickly fled to the mountains. The Muslims took their cattle, clothes and captured one man.  The captured man embraced Islam and Muhammad released him.

See also
Military career of Muhammad
List of expeditions of Muhammad
Muslim–Quraysh War

Notes

627
Campaigns ordered by Muhammad